The Guabirotuba Formation is a late Middle Eocene (Divisaderan in the SALMA classification) geologic formation of the Curitiba Basin in Paraná, Brazil. The formation crops out in and around the city of Curitiba and comprises mudstones and sandstones deposited in a fluvial floodplain environment.

A newly described species of Cingulata; Proeocoleophorus carlinii was also found in the formation.

Description 
The geologists named the formation after , a neighborhood of Curitiba, the capital of Paraná State. The formation is the lowermost sedimentary unit in the  Curitiba Basin, a Cenozoic continental rift basin of southeastern Brazil, overlying Cambrian basement comprising gneisses, amphibolites and migmatites of the Atuba Complex and metasediments of the Açungui Group.

Lithologies 

The sediments of the formation contain between 0.24 and 2.61% heavy minerals. Heavy mineral analysis on the very abundant zircons, abundant epidote, common tourmaline and kyanite and rare rutile has provided insight in the paleocurrents of the fluvial environment, with predominant flow directions towards the northwest and east-northeast.

Age 
The age of the formation has been a matter of debate, with early descriptions assigning the formation to the Miocene to Pliocene, but after the discovery of a mammal fauna described by Sedor et al. in 2017, the age of the formation has been defined as late Middle Eocene, or "Barrancan", which is a sub-age of the Divisaderan South American land mammal age, ranging from approximately 42 to 39 Ma.

Paleontological significance 
The Guabirotuba Formation is one of few formations in Brazil providing Paleogene mammal faunas, between the older Tiupampan Maria Farinha Formation of the Parnaíba Basin and the Itaboraian Itaboraí Formation of the Itaboraí Basin in Rio de Janeiro State, and the younger Tinguirirican Entre-Córregos Formation of the Aiuruoca Basin and the Deseadan Tremembé Formation of the Taubaté Basin.

Fossil content 
Fossils recovered from the formation include:

See also 
 Abanico Formation, contemporaneous fossiliferous formation of Chile
 Macarao Formation, contemporaneous formation of Colombia
 Soncco Formation, contemporaneous fossiliferous formation of Peru

Notes and references

Notes

References

Bibliography 
  
 
  
 
 
 
 

Geologic formations of Brazil
Eocene Series of South America
Paleogene Brazil
Bartonian Stage
Divisaderan
Mudstone formations
Sandstone formations
Conglomerate formations
Fluvial deposits
Fossiliferous stratigraphic units of South America
Paleontology in Brazil
Formations
Tupi–Guarani languages